Caroline Wozniacki was the defending champion, but withdrew before her second round match.

Anastasia Pavlyuchenkova won the title, defeating Daria Gavrilova in the final, 5–7, 6–3, 7–6(7–3).

Seeds

Draw

Finals

Top half

Bottom half

Qualifying

Seeds

Qualifiers

Draw

First qualifier

Second qualifier

Third qualifier

Fourth qualifier

Fifth qualifier

Sixth qualifier

References
Main Draw
Qualifying Draw

External links

Hong Kong Tennis Open
Hong Kong Open (tennis)
2017 in Hong Kong sport